Sujeewong is a rural locality in the Western Downs Region, Queensland, Australia.

Sujeewong's postcode is 4413.

Geography 
The Auburn River enters the locality from the north (Eidsvold West) and exits to the south (Auburn); it is a tributary of the Burrnett River.

There are three state forests in the locality: Ballymore in the north, Sujeewong in the north-east, and Mount Auburn in the south-east.

Apart from the forests, the land use is grazing on native vegetation.

History 
Auburn River State School opened on 3 February 1969. The school was mothballed on 20 February 2007 and officially  closed on 5 June 2008. It was located at 11779 Auburn Road (on the south-west corner of Arndts Road).

Economy 
There are a number of homesteads in the locality:
 Mount Auburn Outstation
 Sujeewong

Education 
There are no schools in Sujeewong nor nearby. The school options are distance education and boarding schools.

References 

Western Downs Region
Localities in Queensland